Abu Nakhla is a district in Qatar, located in the municipality of Al-Shahaniya. Previously a village of some importance stood here, but by the 21st century was largely depopulated. It was recorded as a stand-alone district in zone no. 81 with Al Mukaynis in the 2004 census, but both districts lost their census designations to Mebaireek. In 2014, Abu Nakhla was moved from Al Rayyan Municipality to the newly-created Al-Shahaniya Municipality.

The district is host to Qatar's only water park. A hospital managed by the Hamad Medical Corporation is based here to meet the health needs for workers of the nearby Doha Industrial Area.

Etymology
"Abu" is the Arabic word for father, and serves to denote a geographical feature. The second word, "nakhla", is the local term for a palm tree, and was chosen in reference to a lone palm tree found in the area.

Geography

Abu Nakhla Pond
Since 1985, sewage effluent from Doha has been dumped in a depression (rawda) in Abu Nakhla. Combined with gradual and continuous rainfall during the rainy season, the depression has morphed into a 2 to 3 km pond. Locals have long complained about negative environmental and health effects resulting from the pond, including increased pest populations, foul odors and seepage into aquifers. There is also a strong perception that the sewage water is untreated, and could pose a health hazard. From 2014 to 2015, a study was carried out on the area to investigate potential environmental hazards posed by the pond.

The study revealed that, in regards to lithology, the rocks of the pond comprised two members of the Eocene-period Dammam Formation: the Simsima/Umm Bab Member and the Midra Shale Member. The former member is known for its shallow aquifer, as well as for its weak structure and frequent crevices and fissures, which make it susceptible to contamination by sewage leakage from the pond. Of the water quality, the pond was found to contain low amounts of bacterial contaminants due to Qatar's use of sophisticated filtration techniques. Concentrations of heavy metals were also found to be within acceptable ranges.

Various species of wildlife currently reside in and around the pond, including frogs, fish, and at least 260 bird species. Approximately 150 greater flamingos have been recorded in the area. Plant life is also abundant here; approximately 10% of Qatar's documented plant species are represented here.

Attractions

Qatar's first water park was opened in Abu Nakhla in October 2010. Cypriot company Aqua Masters was responsible for the park's planning and development while Kuwaiti Al Jazeera Entertainment Enterprises Company oversees its operation. Spread out over a 50,000 m² area, the park can accommodate up to 3,000 visitors at a time. A 300,000 m² tourist resort is under development next to the park.

Agriculture
As part of the Ministry of Municipality and Environment's Al Azab program to help improve the healthcare for livestock, it was announced in 2019 that a modern veterinary clinic is planned for the district.

Water reservoir
Abu Nakhla is one of five sites for the government-sponsored project to develop reservoirs in the country. Once completed, the reservoirs are expected to be the largest in the world in their category, with a total length of 650 km and constructed at a cost of QR 14.5 billion. In June 2018, the first phase of the project was completed.

References

Populated places in Al-Shahaniya